George Armstrong (born 7 September 1962 in London, England) is a former actor.

His first role was as Hubert Lane in Just William (alongside Bonnie Langford as Violet Elizabeth Bott) in 1977. He is best known for the part of Alan Humphries in BBCs Grange Hill, a part he played between 1978 and 1982, and again in 1983 in the spin-off series Tucker's Luck. His last role was PC Driscoll in The Bill in 1989.

Since giving up acting, he has become a Technical Theatre Manager at a public school.

External links 
 

1962 births
Living people
English male television actors